Henry Townshend may refer to:

Henry Townshend (died 1621) (1537–1621), MP for Bridgnorth and Ludlow
Henry Townshend (died 1762) (1736–1762), MP for Eye
Henry Dive Townshend (1796–1882), British Army officer
Henry Townshend (Silent Hill), character in Silent Hill 4: The Room

See also
Henry Townsend (disambiguation)